The 1971 Washington Huskies football team was an American football team that represented the University of Washington during the 1971 NCAA University Division football season.  In its 15th season under head coach Jim Owens, the team compiled an 8–3 record (4–3 in the Pacific-8 Conference, tied for third), and outscored its opponents 357 to 188.

Washington opened with four non-conference wins, and junior quarterback Sonny Sixkiller was featured in a Sports Illustrated cover story. They lost the Pac-8 opener to defending champion Stanford in Seattle, then at border rival Oregon by two points, as a short field goal attempt in the last minute missed wide right.

After rebounding with three wins to improve to 7–2, the season ended with two home games. USC won by one point for UW's third loss; in the Apple Cup, the Huskies notched a third consecutive win over Washington State.

The Pac-8 did not allow a second bowl team until the 1975 season; the Huskies climbed to #19 in the final AP poll in January.

Schedule

Roster

NFL Draft selections
One University of Washington Husky was selected in the 1972 NFL Draft, which lasted seventeen rounds with 442 selections.

References

Washington
Washington Huskies football seasons
Washington Huskies football